Mellia may refer  to:
Mi'ilya, old name for
Mimicia